Georgi Todorov may refer to:

Georgi Todorov (canoeist) (born 1927), Bulgaria at the 1964 Summer Olympics
Georgi Todorov (general) (1864–1934), Bulgarian general
Georgi Todorov (gymnast) (born 1949), Bulgarian Olympic gymnast
Georgi Todorov (shot putter) (born 1960), Bulgarian athlete
Georgi Todorov (weightlifter) (born 1952), Bulgarian weightlifter, 1976 Olympics silver medalist